Sara Lucy Bagby (1843 – July 14, 1906) was the last person in the United States forced to return to slavery in the South under the Fugitive Slave Act.

Born in the early 1840s in Virginia, she eventually escaped slavery via the Underground Railroad and made her way to Cleveland, Ohio, in a free state. In January 1861, she was pursued by her owners, William Goshorn and his son, and arrested by a U.S. Marshall.

Despite the state government's and citizens of Cleveland's attempts to intervene—including a purported dramatic armed standoff in a courtroom—she was transported back to Goshorn's property in  Wheeling, then still part of Virginia. This episode forms the subject of a poem by Frances Ellen Watkins Harper, titled "To the Cleveland Union-Savers" (1861):

Men of Cleveland, had a vulture

Sought a timid dove for prey

Would you not, with human pity,

Drive the gory bird away?

Had you seen a feeble lambkin,

Shrinking from a wolf so bold,

Would ye not to shield the trembler,

In your arms have made its fold?

But when she, a hunted sister,

Stretched her hands that ye might save,

Colder far than Zembla's regions,

Was the answer that ye gave.

On the Union's bloody altar,

Was your hapless victim laid;

Mercy, truth, and justice shuddered,

But your hands would give no aid.

And ye sent her back to the torture,

Robbed of freedom and of fright.

Thrust the wretched, captive stranger.

Back to slavery's gloomy night.

Back where brutal men may trample,

On her honor and her fame;

And unto her lips so dusky,

Press the cup of woe and shame.

There is blood upon our city,

Dark and dismal is the stain;

And your hands would fail to cleanse it,

Though Lake Erie ye should drain.

There's a curse upon your Union,

Fearful sounds are in the air;

As if thunderbolts were framing,

Answers to the bondsman's prayer.

Ye may offer human victims,

Like the heathen priests of old;

And may barter manly honor

For the Union and for gold.

But ye can not stay the whirlwind,

When the storm begins to break;

And our God doth rise in judgment,

For the poor and needy's sake.

And, your sin-cursed, guilty Union,

Shall be shaken to its base,

Till ye learn that simple justice,

Is the right of every race. 

After the Emancipation Proclamation, Bagby walked to Pittsburgh to leave the South. She eventually resettled in Cleveland, where she died in 1906 and was buried.

References 

1843 births
1906 deaths
19th-century African-American women
African-American abolitionists
African-American history of Ohio
African-American history of Virginia
African Americans in the American Civil War
American rebel slaves
Fugitive American slaves
History of Ohio
History of slavery in Virginia
History of Virginia
People from Virginia
19th-century American slaves
Underground Railroad people
Fugitive American slaves returned to their owners
20th-century African-American people
20th-century African-American women